The Chansons gaillardes (Ribald songs) FP 42, are a song cycle of eight pieces composed by Francis Poulenc in 1925–1926 "In euphoria and post-war" on anonymous texts of the 17th century. The work was dedicated to Mme Fernand Allard.

This cycle was premiered in concert on 2 May 1926 at the Salle des agriculteurs, 8  in the 9th arrondissement of Paris, by Pierre Bernac, as a 26-year-old baritone virtually unknown, and Francis Poulenc, 27 years old, as the pianist. It was the memory of this first collaboration that would bring together Poulenc and Bernac several years later for many international tours, from 1934 to 1959.

Composition of the cycle 
The titles of the eight pieces, of which the tempi alternate quick and slow movements, are as follow:
 "La Maîtresse volage" – Rondement
 "Chanson à boire" – Adagio
 "Madrigal" – Très décidé
 "Invocation aux Parques" – Grave
 "Couplets bachiques" – Très animé
 "L'Offrande" – Modéré
 'La Belle Jeunesse" – Très animé
 "Sérénade" – Modéré

Analysis 
On the one hand, the text of Les Chansons gaillardes comes from anonymous texts of the seventeenth century, written in a tone of celebration and alcohol: "texts rather scabrous", according to Francis Poulenc himself. On the other hand, in the Journal de mes mélodies, Poulenc explains about them: "I hold this collection dear where I tried to demonstrate that obscenity can accommodate music. I hate ribaldry."

Most texts imply a particular play on words, a lightness in the form of code. For example, in the "Chanson à boire" (a different setting and a different text to Chanson à boire, 1922), the words celebrate "the kings of Egypt and Syria" because they "wanted their body to be embalmed, to last longer, dead", and conclude,  (Let's therefore drink according to our desire! ... Let us embalm!")

References

Sources

Further reading
1926: Chansons gaillardes, score published by Heugel & Cie, (ISMN M047-29356-5)
1964: Francis Poulenc, Journal de mes mélodies, éditions Grasset ; Reissued in 1993, a full text prepared and annotated by Renaud Machart, éditions Cicéro and Éditions Durand-Salabert-Eschig, Paris, 1993  ;
2011: Francis Poulenc, J'écris ce qui me chante, Texts and interviews presented and annotated by Nicolas Southon, 2011, 982 p. ;

External links 
 Texts of the songs at the LiederNet Archive
 ,  (bass-baritone), Pascal Rogé (piano)
 
 Bilingual texts on Melodie Treasury
 Chansons gaillardes, FP42 on Hyperion
 Chansons gaillardes on data.bnf.fr

Compositions by Francis Poulenc
1925 compositions
Classical song cycles in French
Music with dedications